Tavakkol (also Romanized as Tokal, Tūkal, and Tū Kol; also known as Tojdan, Tū Gol, Tūjān, and Tūjdān) is a village in Sarbuk Rural District, Sarbuk District, Qasr-e Qand County, Sistan and Baluchestan Province, Iran. At the 2006 census, its population was 1,084, in 207 families.

References 

Populated places in Qasr-e Qand County